Odisha TV or OTV is an Odia Indian Cable Television station. It is owned by the Bhubaneswar-based Odisha Television Network. It was started and promoted by Jagi Mangat Panda. Odisha Television (OTV) is the first private Electronic Media in the state of Odisha.

Launched in 1997 in the twin cities of Bhubaneswar and Cuttack, the channel slowly spread to all major towns of the state. It was converted from cable to a satellite channel in December 2006.

List of programmes
Most programmes of OTV are news based. It also has programmes related to art and culture, tourism, business, food and festivals. 
Some of its programmes include the following.

Aagyan Mind Kale Ki
Gapa Saap
The Great Odisha Political Circus
Jibana Do Chakire Ashara Alok
Janamancha
E-News - Pupul Bhuyan (presentor)
Jatra Ra Jatra
Khola Katha
News Fuse
Taste Of Odisha
Police File
Aparadha Diary
Akuha Katha
Sakalara Khabara
Sarbe Bhabantu Sukhinaha
Aapana Eka Nuhanti
Doctor Doctor
Bastu Bichara
News @ 9 Bulletin
News @ 9 Discussion
News @11 Bulletin

Elephant rescue incident
On 24 September 2021, an Odisha TV journalist died while another was critically injured when the boat they were travelling to cover the elephant rescue overturned due to the river current. An ODRAF personnel also died in the incident. The elephant rescue operation was put on hold after the boat overturned. The elephant was eventually found dead after he unable to cross the river.

See also
List of Odia-language television channels
List of longest-running Indian television series
List of television stations in India

References

External links
  

Odisha Television Network
Odia-language television channels
Television channels and stations established in 1997
Television stations in Bhubaneswar
Companies based in Bhubaneswar
1997 establishments in Orissa